China United SME Guarantee Corporation (commonly known as Sino Guarantee) is a Chinese financial services company that provides financial guarantees for loans and bonds. Its key shareholder is the Export Import Bank of China, one of China's main policy banks. The company is described by Moody's as playing a quasi-policy role in Chinese capital markets as its creation was guided by the National Development and Reform Commission, China's key government body for economic planning.

References

Insurance companies of China